Procyon is a genus of nocturnal mammals comprising three species commonly known as raccoons in the family Procyonidae. The most familiar species, the common raccoon (P. lotor), is often known simply as "the" raccoon, as the two other raccoon species in the genus are native only to the tropics and less well known. Genetic studies have shown that the closest relatives of raccoons are the ring-tailed cats and cacomistles of genus Bassariscus, from which they diverged about 10 million years ago.

General attributes
Raccoons are unusual, for their thumbs (though not opposable) enable them to open many closed containers (such as garbage cans and doors). They are omnivores with a reputation for being clever and mischievous; their intelligence and dexterity equip them to survive in a wide range of environments and are one of the few medium-to-large-sized animals that have enlarged their range since human encroachment began (another is the coyote). Raccoon hindfeet are plantigrade similar to those of humans and bears. Raccoons are sometimes considered vermin or a nuisance. They have readily adapted to urban environments (compare urban opossums, skunks and foxes), scavenging garbage bins and other food sources.

Male raccoons are generally larger than females. A baby raccoon is called a kit.

Raccoons can live up to 16 years in the wild, though most do not make it through their second year. A raccoon that survives past its youth will live an average of five years. Primary causes of mortality include humans (hunting, trapping, cars) and malnutrition.

Species

There are three extant species of raccoon: 

Some raccoons once considered as separate species are now thought to be the same as or subspecies of the common raccoon, including the Barbados raccoon (P. gloveralleni), Nassau raccoon (P. maynardi), Guadeloupe raccoon (P. minor), and Tres Marias raccoon (P. insularis) (Helgen and Wilson 2005). Procyon brachyurus  was described from captive specimens; its identity is undeterminable as the remains of the two animals assigned to this taxon cannot be located and may have been lost.

Nomenclature
The word "raccoon" is derived from the Algonquian word , "he who scratches with his hands". Spanish-speaking colonists similarly adopted their term, from  the Nahuatl word for the animal, meaning roughly "that which has hands".

The genus name, Procyon, comes from the Greek for "before the dog"; this term is also used for the star Procyon of the constellation Canis Minor.

Raccoons are today understood to have a relatively loose evolutionary relationship with bears, which was nonetheless seen as significant by the early taxonomists; Carl Linnaeus initially placed the raccoon in the genus Ursus. One exception is Russian, where raccoon is named  due to similarity between raccoon and genet furs. However, the full name of the common raccoon in Russian is also water-related: it is called , which means "rinsing raccoon".

In some cases, the "washing" descriptor is applied only to the common raccoon species: for example, in French the common raccoon is called  or "washing rat", while its Linnaean binomial is Procyon lotor or, roughly, "washing pre-dog". In contrast, the crab-eating raccoon is "little crab-catching rat" and "crab-eating pre-dog" (Procyon cancrivorus) in French and Latin, respectively.

Literature
 
Helgen, K.M. & Wilson, D.E. 2005. A systematic and zoogeographic overview of the raccoons of Mexico and Central America. Pp. 219–234 in Sanchez-Cordero, V. & Medellin, R.A. (eds.). Contribuciones Mastozoologicas: en Homenaje a Bernardo Villa. Mexico City: Instituto de Biologia e Instituto de Ecologia, UNAM.

See also
 List of procyonids - all species in the parent family Procyonidae
 Raccoon dog - an unrelated animal sometimes confused with raccoons
 Red panda

References

External links

Raccoons on Bear Tracker
World Wide Raccoon Web Gallery

Procyonidae
Mammal genera
Extant Pliocene first appearances
Taxa named by Gottlieb Conrad Christian Storr
Fur trade